Reg, Reggie or Reginald Turner may refer to:

People
Reginald Turner (1869–1938), English author, aesthete and member of Oscar Wilde's circle
Reg Turner (actor), English performer in 1971's Farm Fresh Food (The Goodies)
Reg Turner (politician), leader of the New Zealand Representative Party in 2008
Reggie Turner (musician), American composer on 1992's Free (The Party album)
Reggie Turner (basketball) (born 1966), American forward in 1989 NBA Draft
Reggie Turner (filmmaker), American documentary director (2008's Before They Die! on Tulsa race riot#Representation in other media)
Reginald Reader 'Reggie' Turner, Sussex rugby player and president of rugby club (List of Old Emanuels#Rugby)

Fictional characters
Reg Turner, foreman and pattern cutter in 1961–63 British sitcom The Rag Trade
Reg Turner, businessman in British mercantile drama The Brothers (1972 TV series)#Series 2